NATAL or Natal may refer to:

Places
 Natal, Rio Grande do Norte, a city in Brazil
 Natal, South Africa (disambiguation), a region in South Africa
 Natalia Republic, a former country (1839–1843)
 Colony of Natal, a former British colony (1843–1910)
 Natal (province), a former province (1910–1994)
 KwaZulu-Natal, a province (since 1994)
 Mandailing Natal Regency, a regency in Indonesia
 Natal, North Sumatra, a town in the above regency
 Natal, Iran, a village in Mazandaran Province, Iran
 Natal, British Columbia, a coal-mining community in the East Kootenay region of Canada

Biology
 Of or relating to birth
 Childbirth
 Natal banana frog, a species of frog (Afrixalus spinifrons)
 Natal dwarf puddle frog, a species of frog (Phrynobatrachus natalensis)
 Natal ghost frog, a species of frog (Heleophryne natalensis)
 Natal sand frog, a species of frog (Tomopterna natalensis)

Military
 Ingobamakhosi Carbineers, an infantry regiment of the South African Army, formerly known as the Natal Carbineers
 King Cetshwayo Artillery Regiment, an artillery regiment of the South African Army, 
 Queen Nandi Mounted Rifles, an armoured regiment of the South African Army, formerly known as the Natal Mounted Rifles
 Natal Native Contingent, a large force of black auxiliary soldiers in British South Africa during the 1879 Anglo-Zulu War
 Natal (ship), two warships

Sports
 KwaZulu-Natal cricket team, South African cricket team
 , the Natal rugby union team, South Africa

Other
 "Natal" (song), a 1991 single by Chico & Roberta
 Natal de Carvalho Baroni (born 1945), Brazilian football player
 Natal Day, a civic holiday in Canada
 NATAL Israel, Israel's Trauma Center for Victims of Terror and War
 Natal Observatory, an astronomical observatory in the Colony of Natal from 1882 to 1911
 Apostolic Vicariate of Natal, a former Catholic missionary jurisdiction, South Africa
 Kinect (code name Project Natal), a motion-based control system for the Xbox 360 video game console
 Roman Catholic Archdiocese of Natal, archdiocese in Brazil
 University of Natal, South Africa